Mykyta Kravchenko (born 14 June 1997) is a Ukrainian professional footballer who plays as a midfielder for FC Dynamo Kyiv in the Ukrainian Premier League.

Career
He is a product of the FC Illichivets Mariupol sportive school.

Kravchenko made his debut for FC Illichivets Mariupol against FC Metalurh Donetsk in the Ukrainian Premier League on 18 April 2015.

In July 2015 he signed a contract with FC Dynamo Kyiv. On 26 April 2017, he made his Dynamo debut in a 4-0 Ukrainian Cup victory over FC Mykolaiv at Tsentralnyi Stadion, when he came on as a substitute for Vitorino Antunes on the 69th minute.

Career statistics

References

External links

1997 births
Living people
People from Zuhres
Ukrainian footballers
FC Mariupol players
FC Dynamo Kyiv players
FC Olimpik Donetsk players
FC Kolos Kovalivka players
SC Dnipro-1 players
Ukrainian Premier League players
Association football midfielders
Ukraine youth international footballers
Sportspeople from Donetsk Oblast